Two vessels of the Royal Navy have been named HMS Muros for Muros:

 was the French privateer Alcide, launched at Bordeaux in 1804. The Royal Navy captured her in 1806, renamed her, and commissioned her. She wrecked in March 1808.
 was a  launched in 1809 at Chatham Dockyard. She had a relatively uneventful career though she did participate in one major campaign. She was sold in 1822 for breaking up.

 Royal Navy ship names